Lacan is the surname of:
 Jacques(-Marie-Émile) Lacan (1901–1981), French psychoanalyst and psychiatrist
 The Seminars of Jacques Lacan
 From Bakunin to Lacan: Anti-Authoritarianism and the Dislocation of Power, a book on political philosophy by Saul Newman
 Lacan at the Scene
 Judith Miller (philosopher), (née Lacan, 1941–2017)

French-language surnames